Baptism of Christ is a 1567-1569 painting by El Greco. It is now in the Historical Museum of Crete in Heraklion.

The painting closely resembles El Greco's The Baptism of Christ panel of his Modena Triptych (1568).

References 

El Greco, Heraklion
Paintings by El Greco
1560s paintings